Giacomo is an Italian name corresponding to English James. 

Notable people with the name include:

Given name
Giacomo Acerbo (1888–1969), Italian economist and Fascist politician 
Giacomo Aconcio (1492–1566), Italian jurist, theologian, philosopher and engineer
Giacomo Agostini (born 1942), Italian motorcycle road racer
Giacomo Antonelli (1806–1876), Italian cardinal
Giacomo Aragall (born 1939), Catalan tenor
Giacomo Balla (1871–1958), Italian painter
Giacomo Barozzi da Vignola (1507–1573), Italian Mannerism architect
Giacomo Beltrami (1779–1855), Italian jurist, author, and explorer
Giacomo Biffi (1928–2015), Italian cardinal
Giacomo Bonaventura (born 1989), Italian footballer
Giacomo Boni (archaeologist) (1859–1925), Italian archaeologist specializing in Roman architecture
Giacomo Boni (painter) (1688–1766), Italian painter of the late-Baroque period, active mainly in Genoa
Giacomo Brodolini (1920–1969), Italian politician 
Giacomo Carissimi (1605–1674), Italian Baroque composer
Giacomo Casanova (1725–1798), Venetian adventurer and author
Giacomo Ceruti (1698–1767), Italian late Baroque painter
Giacomo Colombo (1663–1730) Italian late Baroque sculptor, working in Naples.
Giacomo Doria (1840–1913), Italian naturalist
Giacomo Durazzo (1717–1794), Italian diplomat and man of the theatre
Giacomo Feo (c. 1471–1495), second husband of Caterina Sforza
Giacomo Ferrari, multiple people
Giacomo Gastaldi (ca 1500–1566), Italian cartographer
Giacomo di Grassi, (16th century), Italian fencing master and author
Giacomo Lauri-Volpi (1892–1979), Italian tenor who performed throughout Europe and the Americas
Giacomo da Lentini (13th century), Italian poet
Giacomo Leone (born 1971), Italian long-distance runner
Giacomo Leoni (1686–1746), Italian architect
Giacomo Leopardi (1798–1837), Italian poet, essayist, philosopher, and philologist
Giacomo Lercaro (1891–1976), Italian cardinal
Giacomo Manzù (1908–1991), Italian sculptor
Giacomo Matteotti (1885–1924), Italian socialist parliamentarian, murdered by the Fascists for his opposition to Mussolini
Giacomo Medici (general) (1817–1882), Italian patriot and soldier
Giacomo Meyerbeer (1791–1864), German-born opera composer
Giacomo Nizzolo (born 1989), Italian road cyclist
Giacomo della Porta (c. 1533–1602), Italian architect and sculptor
Giacomo Puccini (1858–1924), Italian composer
Giacomo Quarenghi (1744–1817), Italian architect
Giacomo Ricci (born 1985), Italian racing driver
Giacomo Sagripanti, Italian conductor
Giacomo Tomaselli (born 1999), Italian footballer

Other 
Gian Giacomo Medici di Marignano (1495–1555), Italian condottiero, Duke of Marignano and Marquess of Musso and Lecco in Lombardy

Fictional characters 
Giacomo Dante, a character in the manga Gunslinger Girl
Giacomo, a character in the Baten Kaitos video game series
Giacomo, a character from Pokémon Scarlet and Violet

Italian masculine given names